Percy Hamilton Stewart (January 10, 1867, Newark, New Jersey – June 30, 1951, Plainfield, New Jersey) was a Democratic Party politician who represented New Jersey's 5th congressional district in the United States House of Representatives for one term from 1931 to 1933.

Early life and education
Stewart was born in Newark, New Jersey on January 10, 1867, where he attended the public schools. He graduated from Yale College in 1890, where he was a member of Skull and Bones, and from Columbia Law School in 1893. He  was admitted to the bar the same year and commenced practice in New York City.

Political career
He served as Mayor of Plainfield, New Jersey from 1912 to 1913. He was chairman of the Union County Democratic committee in 1914 and of the Washington Rock Park Commission of New Jersey from 1915-1921. Stewart served as a member of the New Jersey State Board of Education from 1919–1921 and of the New Jersey State Highway Commission from 1923-1929. He was a delegate to the Democratic National Conventions in 1920 and 1928.

Congress
Stewart was elected as a Democrat to the Seventy-second Congress to fill the vacancy caused by the death of Ernest R. Ackerman and served from December 1, 1931, to March 3, 1933. He was not a candidate for renomination in 1932, but was an unsuccessful candidate for election to the United States Senate.

Later career and death
He resumed the practice of law until his retirement in 1941. He died in Plainfield on June 30, 1951 and was interred in Hillside Cemetery in Scotch Plains, New Jersey.

References

1867 births
1951 deaths
Columbia Law School alumni
Mayors of Plainfield, New Jersey
Politicians from Newark, New Jersey
Democratic Party members of the United States House of Representatives from New Jersey
Yale College alumni
Burials at Hillside Cemetery (Scotch Plains, New Jersey)
20th-century American politicians